Fountaintown may refer to some places in the United States:

 Fountaintown, Indiana, an unincorporated town in Van Buren Township
 Fountaintown, North Carolina, a community in Duplin County